Danuta Wieczorek-Szwaj (born 27 April 1949) is a Polish former professional tennis player.

Born in Pszczyna, Wieczorek grew up in the south of Poland and was a Wimbledon junior semi-finalist.

Wieczorek, an eight-time national singles champion, represented Poland in the 1968 Federation Cup competition, winning two singles rubbers. One of those wins came against Astrid Suurbeek in a World Group second round loss to the Netherlands. In 1969 she featured in the singles and doubles mains draw of the French Open.

See also
List of Poland Fed Cup team representatives

References

External links
 
 

1949 births
Living people
Polish female tennis players
People from Pszczyna
Sportspeople from Silesian Voivodeship